This small Washington state company offered time-sharing on a PDP-10.  Its customers included Bill Gates and Paul Allen.

Nicknamed C-Cubed, this company was founded in 1968 and closed in 1970.

Misc
Two other companies, both based in New Jersey, used similar names.

References

Defunct companies based in Washington (state)